Gross Lengden is a village in the Gleichen in the Göttingen district of Lower Saxony, Germany, about ten kilometers east of Göttingen. It had 1,040 inhabitants as of 2005.   The village lies at the foot of the hills leading to the Mackenröder Spitze.

The village's heart is characterized by small winding streets and well-preserved half-timbered houses. In two years running (1996, 1997), it won prizes for improved village appearance.

The earliest mention of the community is an AD 822 chronicle of the Fulda Abbey, where it is referred to as "Lengidi" and "Lengithi.“

Government

Mayor: Joachim Johannes Thiery

Significant people associated with Gross Lengden

Heinrich Albert Lion (born in Bamberg in 1796; died in Groß Lengden in 1867), Classical philologist
Friedrich Ernst Fehsenfeld (1853–1933), co-founder of the  Karl-May-Verlag publishing house

Sources

Das bietet Groß Lengden:  http://www.gleichen.de/gr-lengden/home.htm

Gross Lengden:  http://www.gross-lengden.de/

Villages in Lower Saxony